Motke, Mordkhe, or Mordka are Jewish given names,  diminutives of Mordechai. Notable people referred to as Motke include:

 Motke Rosenthal, or Márk Rózsavölgyi (1787-1848), Jewish Hungarian  composer and violinist
Mordechai (Motke) Maklef (1920–1978), Chief of Staff of the Israel Defense Forces
Motke Chabad (19th century), Jewish Lithuanian jester from Vilnius
Mordka Mendel Grossman (1913-1945), photographer and worker in the Statistical Department of the Litzmannstadt Ghetto
Mordka was the birth given name of Mark Zamenhof (1837-1907)
Mordkhe Schaechter (1927-2007), Yiddish linguist
Mordkhe Veynger (1890–1929), Soviet-Jewish linguist

Fictional characters
Motke the Thief, a 1913 novel by Sholem Ash
 Motke the Angel of Death, a 1926 novel by Ilya Selvinsky

See also

Jewish given names